Franklin Township is one of seventeen townships in Kosciusko County, Indiana. As of the 2010 census, its population was 1,127 and it contained 439 housing units.

Franklin Township was organized in 1838.

Geography

Cities and towns
 Mentone (south side)

Unincorporated towns
 Beaver Dam at 
 Lowman Corner at 
 Sevastopol at 
(This list is based on USGS data and may include former settlements.)

References

External links
 Indiana Township Association
 United Township Association of Indiana

Townships in Kosciusko County, Indiana
Townships in Indiana